Depressaria chaerophylli is a moth of the family Depressariidae.

Distribution
This species can be found in most of Europe, the Caucasus, Libya and Palestine.

Habitat
These moths mainly inhabit woodland edges, hedgerows and old lanes.

Description

The forewings show a reddish brown ground colour, with scattered dark brown dots along the edges. On the thorax there is a large whitish area.

This species is rather similar to Depressaria depressana and Depressaria pimpinellae.

Biology
Adults are on wing from July to August, and after hibernating, until April in one generation per year.

The larvae are pale yellow, with a pale orange head, with well marked brown lozenges and two brown side lines on the back,

They feed on Chaerophyllum species (hence the species name), including Chaerophyllum temulum, Chaerophyllum bulbosum and Chaerophyllum aureum. They live in between the flowers of the host plant, which they spin together with silk, forming a larval web in the inflorescence.

References

External links

lepiforum.de 
Naturhistoriska risksmuseet 

Moths described in 1839
Depressaria
Moths of Europe
Moths of Asia
Moths of Africa
Taxa named by Philipp Christoph Zeller